Kinikinik Lake is located in central Alberta, Canada, north of the provincial capital, Edmonton. It is approximately 614 meters above sea level.

The name of this lake is a palindrome.

External links 
Dynamic map showing location of Kinikinik Lake

Athabasca County
Lakes of Alberta